Raising Cane's Chicken Fingers is an American fast-food  chain specializing in chicken fingers founded  in 1996 in Baton Rouge, Louisiana by Todd Graves and Craig Silvey. The company is named after Graves's dog, a yellow Labrador. Other yellow  Labradors have served as company mascots, as well as certified therapy animals.

History
Founders Todd Graves and Craig Silvey were both enrolled in a business plan writing course while studying at different universities. Graves wrote the business plan and Silvey submitted it, for which Silvey received a C-minus grade. At the time, Graves worked at Guthrie's Chicken Fingers. The business plan was rejected numerous times by potential investors, so Graves earned the needed money working as a boilermaker in a Los Angeles, California refinery and fishing for sockeye salmon in Alaska. He and Silvey obtained an SBA loan, which they used to open their first restaurant, located in Baton Rouge at the intersection of Highland Road and State Street near the LSU campus.

In 2022 Raising Cane's sued a shopping center in Hobart, Indiana because Cane's had missed discovering, before they'd signed a long-term lease, that the shopping center had a non-compete agreement with McDonalds that prohibited other vendors selling chicken fingers in the complex.

International expansion
The chain first began expanding internationally in 2015, opening its first restaurant in Kuwait. The namesake mascot, a dog, is not seen on signage and merchandise, as dogs are not popular in Kuwait.

COVID-19 pandemic
In March 2020, many of Cane's locations switched from dine-in to pick-up and take out service only because of the COVID-19 pandemic, while others closed temporarily. As of July 2020, certain locations had reopened their dining rooms, although Graves said the company was in no rush to do so on the full scale.

In 2021, in response to a shortage of workers the company began dispatching hundreds of corporate employees to work in its restaurants as cooks and cashiers, in addition to their existing duties regarding the hiring of new employees. The company plans to hire 10,000 new employees. The company's co-CEO claims that corporate employees are trained in the kitchen and on the register under normal circumstances.

References

Chicken chains of the United States
Fast-food chains of the United States
Fast-food poultry restaurants
Regional restaurant chains in the United States
Restaurants established in 1996
Companies based in Baton Rouge, Louisiana
Restaurants in Louisiana
1996 establishments in Louisiana
American companies established in 1996
Privately held companies based in Louisiana